The Prothesis is the place in the sanctuary in which the Liturgy of Preparation takes place in the Eastern Orthodox and Greek-Catholic Churches. Prothesis and diaconicon are collectively referred to as pastophoria.

The Prothesis is located behind the Iconostasis and consists of a small table, also known as the Table of Oblation, on which the bread and wine are prepared for the Divine Liturgy. It is most often placed on the north side of the Altar, or in a separate chamber (itself referred to as the Prothesis) on the north side of the central apse.

Originally, the Prothesis was located in the same room as the Holy Table, being simply a smaller table placed against the eastern wall to the north of the Holy Table. During the reign of the Emperor Justin II (565–574), it came to occupy its own separate chamber to the north of the sanctuary, having a separate apse, and joined to the Altar by an arched opening. Another apsed chamber was added on the south side for the Diaconicon. So that from this time forward, large Orthodox churches were triapsidal (having three apses on the eastern side). Smaller churches still have only one chamber containing the Altar, the Prothesis and the Diaconicon.

In the Syriac Churches, the ritual is different, as both Prothesis and Diaconicon are generally rectangular, and the former constitutes a chamber for the deposit of offerings by the faithful. Consequently, it is sometimes placed on the south side, if by doing so it is more accessible to the laity.

In the Coptic Church, the men will enter the Prothesis to receive holy Communion (the women receive in front of the Holy Doors), and must remove their shoes before entering.

See also
Altar
Diaconicon

Notes

External links
Photo of Prothesis The Altar is in the background, behind the line of priests.

Eastern Christian liturgy
Altars
Church architecture
Byzantine sacred architecture